María Lucía Sánchez Benítez, known as Malú, is a Spanish singer.

She is the niece of the composer and guitarist Paco de Lucía, and is known for songs such as "Aprendiz", "Como Una Flor", "Toda", "Diles", "Si Estoy Loca" and "No Voy a Cambiar". In June 2020, she gave birth to a daughter with Albert Rivera, a former Citizens politician.

Albums

Studio albums

Live albums

Compilations albums

Songs

”Aprendiz”
”Donde quiera que estés”
”Reflejo” (Remix)
”Como una flor” (Dance Remix)
”Lucharé”
”Si tú me dejas...”
”Cambiarás”
”Duele”
”Sin caminos”
”Poema de mi corazón”
”Y si fuera ella”
”Sin ti todo anda mal”
”Toda”
”Ven a pervertirme”
”Me quedó grande tu amor”
”Siempre tú”
”Como cada noche”
”Devuélveme la vida” (ft Antonio Orozco)
”No me extraña nada”
”Enamorada”
”Inevitable”
”Cómo un ángel

”Corazón partío” (ft Alejandro Sanz)
”Enamorada” (ft David DeMaría)
”Malas tentaciones”
”Por una vez”
”Diles”
”Te conozco desde siempre”
”Sabes bien”
”Si estoy loca”
”No voy a cambiar”
”A esto le llamas amor”
”Nadie”
”Cómo te olvido” (ft Jerry Rivera)
"Que Nadie" (ft Manuel Carraso)
”Blanco y negro”
”Ni un segundo”
”Quién”
”Ahora tú”
"Sólo el amor nos salvará (feat. Áleks Syntek)"
"El amor es una cosa simple (ft Tiziano Ferro)"
"Linda (ft Miguel Bosé)"
"Vuelvo a verte" (ft Pablo Alborán)"
"A prueba de ti"
"Me fuí"
"Deshazte de mi"
"Desaparecer"
"Quiero"
"Encadenada A Ti"
"Caos"
"Cenizas"
"Invisible"
"Ciudad de papel"
"Contradiction"
"Oye"
"Cantare"
"Desprevenida"
"Tejiendo Alas"

References

External links
Official website
Russian fansite

1982 births
Living people
Singers from Madrid
21st-century Spanish singers
21st-century Spanish women singers
Sony Music Spain artists
Women in Latin music